The  is a river in Japan which flows from Lake Kunikane in Shōbara in Hiroshima Prefecture.

External links
 Ministry of Agriculture, Forestry and Fisheries information about Lake Kunikane pond 

Rivers of Hiroshima Prefecture
Gōnokawa River
Rivers of Japan